Dongchang District is a district of the city of Tonghua, Jilin, China.

Administrative Divisions
Subdistricts: Guangming Subdistrict, Minzhu Subdistrict, Dongchang Subdistrict, Longquan Subdistrict, Xinzhan Subdistrict, Laozhan Subdistrict, Tuanjie Subdistrict.

The only town is Jinchang

References

External links

County-level divisions of Jilin